Mark Wayne Chase  (born 1951) is a US-born British botanist. He is noted for work in plant classification and evolution, and one of the instigators of the Angiosperm Phylogeny Group-classification for flowering plants which is partly based on DNA studies. In particular he has researched orchids, and currently investigates ploidy and hybridization in Nicotiana. 

In 1984, he received 'The George H.M. Lawrence Memorial Award', in the amount of $2,000, presented by the Hunt Institute for Botanical Documentation, Carnegie Mellon University and presented at the annual banquet of the Botanical Society of America.

In 1998 he shared the Linnean Medal with Colin Patterson. In 2008 he was one of thirteen recipients of the Darwin-Wallace Medal, which was given every 50 years by the Linnean Society of London. Has been the Keeper of the Jodrell Laboratory and now is retired but still an horary research associate at the Royal Botanic Gardens, Kew. He  is a fellow of the Royal Society.

He was awarded the Veitch Memorial Medal of the Royal Horticultural Society in 2014.

Selected publications

Taxa named by Mark Chase 
See Taxa named by Mark Wayne Chase.

References 

1951 births
Living people
British botanists
Veitch Memorial Medal recipients
Fellows of the Royal Society
Botanists active in Kew Gardens